A general election was held in the state of Montana on November 8, 2016, with primaries being held on June 7, 2016. All six executive offices were up for election, as well as the state's U.S. House seat and the state legislature.

Federal elections

President

House of Representatives

Governor

Secretary of State 
Incumbent Democratic Secretary of State Linda McCulloch was term-limited and could not seek re-election to a third term. State Auditor Monica J. Lindeen became the Democratic nominee, while senate minority leader Corey Stapleton was the Republican nominee. Stapleton defeated Lindeen in the general election.

Democratic primary

Republican primary

General election

Attorney General 
Incumbent Republican Attorney General Tim Fox ran for election to a second term. He was easily re-elected over state senator Larry Jent.

Republican primary

Democratic primary

General election

Auditor 
Incumbent Democratic State Auditor Monica J. Lindeen was term-limited and could not run for re-election. Lindeen's chief legal counsel Jesse Laslovich was nominated by the Democratic Party to succeed her. State senator Matt Rosendale became the Republican nominee. Rosendale defeated Laslovich in the general election.

Democratic primary

Republican primary

General election

Superintendent of Public Instruction 
Incumbent Democratic Superintendent of Public Instruction Denise Juneau was term-limited and could not run for re-election. Melissa Romano, an elementary school teacher, was the Democratic nominee. State senator Elsie Arntzen became the Republican nominee. Arntzen won the election by a small margin.

Democratic primary

Republican primary

General election

Public Service Commission 
Three seats of the Montana Public Service Commission were up for election.

District 2 
Incumbent Republican commissioner Kirk Bushman ran for re-election to a second term. He lost renomination to Tony O'Donnell, who won the general election unopposed.

Republican primary

General election

District 3 
Incumbent Republican commissioner Roger Koopman ran for re-election to a second term. State representative Pat Noonan became the Democratic nominee, while Caron Cooper ran as an independent candidate. Koopman won re-election.

Republican primary

Democratic primary

General election

District 4 
Incumbent Republican commissioner Bob Lake ran for re-election to a second term. Democratic former commissioner Gail Gutsche won a three-way primary to run in a rematch against Lake.

Republican primary

Democratic primary

General election

Legislature 

Half of the seats in the Montana Senate and all of the Montana House of Representatives were up for election. The Republican Party expanded their control of the senate while there were no changes in the house regarding seats.

References 

 
Montana